Mihalache Toma (born 24 December 1955) is a Romanian judoka. He competed in the men's middleweight event at the 1980 Summer Olympics.

References

1955 births
Living people
Romanian male judoka
Olympic judoka of Romania
Judoka at the 1980 Summer Olympics
Sportspeople from Iași